Reza Fayazi (in Persian: رضا فیاضی, born ) is an Iranian director and actor. He graduated in theater from Faculty of Fine Arts in University of Tehran.

Biography
In 1976, he played a role in the series Golbaran directed by Reza Babak. He then appeared in the movie Ballad of Tara directed by Bahram Beyzai and also acted as the stage manager. Since then, he has worked in various artistic fields, including writing, puppetry, and radio, and has appeared in several television programs as a presenter.

Selected filmography 
 Ballad of Tara, 1979
 Statue, 1992
 The Fateful Day, 1995
 The Blue Veiled, 1995
 Chariot of Death, 1996
 Starry Sky, 1999
 Under the City's Skin (TV series), 2002
 Roozegar-e Gharib, 2007
 The Enigma of the Shah, 2016-2017
 I'm not Trump, 2020

External links

Who's Who in the Iranian Film Industry

References
I'm not Trump - Amazon Prime

1953 births
Living people
People from Ahvaz
Iranian Arab artists
Iranian film directors
Iranian male film actors
University of Tehran alumni
Iranian male television actors